Isidoro Marín Garés (14 July 1863, Granada - 1926, Granada) was a Spanish painter, ceramicist and art restorer.

Biography

Owing to his precarious financial situation, he practiced a wide variety of artistic activities; including illustrations, posters and lithographs, in addition to the usual paintings, which he made on a variety of media, such as wood, cloth, ceramics and fans. He also did decorative painting for some of the most distinguished families of Granada and worked as an art restorer. For a time, he was a conservator at the Alhambra. 

His professional resumé includes working as a teacher at the "School of Arts and Crafts", and as an assistant to Manuel Gómez-Moreno González, where  numbered among his apprentices.

He exhibited outside of Granada on only one occasion: the 1888 Barcelona Universal Exposition; holding a small showing simultaneously at the Sala Parés.

The works of Mariano Fortuny had a major influence on him; also taking elements from Impressionism, which he applied within a costumbrista aesthetic. Today, he is especially well-remembered for his watercolors.

Sources 
 Biography and works @ the Museo del Prado
 Eduardo Dizy Caso, Les orientalistes de l'école espagnole, ACR Editions, Courveboie, 1997  Online @ Google Books
 Biography @ the Ayuntamiento de Granada

External links 

1863 births
1926 deaths
Spanish painters
Spanish watercolourists
People from Granada